Hustler HD or Hustler HD 3D is a subscription based adult entertainment pay television channel distributed throughout Europe via digital cable as naxoo (in Switzerland) and satellite television. The channel broadcasts in HDTV and 3DTV format. It is owned by the Dutch-based company Sapphire Media International BV.

Hustler HD and Hustler TV offers hardcore pornography aimed at a straight male audience. It is the sister channel to Blue Hustler who specializes in softcore pornography.

External links 
 Official Website

3D television channels
HD-only channels